"Dance All Night" is the debut single by British singer and reality television star Jess Wright, released in the United Kingdom on All Around the World as a digital download on 16 September 2012. The song entered the UK Singles Chart at number 36.

Music video
A music video to accompany the release of "Dance All Night" was first released onto YouTube on 20 June 2012 at a total length of three minutes and twenty-one seconds.

Track listing

Chart performance

Release history

Credits and personnel
Cairon Bell - Composer
Lee Butler - Composer, Producer, A&R
Cab @ AllStar - Assistant Engineer
Steve Cocky - Composer, Producer, Vocal Engineer, A&R
Christian Davies - Composer, Producer, Instrumentation, Mixing, Mastering
Martin O'Shea - Executive Producer, Management
Louise Rogan - Backing Vocals
Emma Rouse - Management
Jessica Wright - Composer, Primary Artist
Recorded at AllStar Studios and Base Studios

References

External links
 Jess Wright on Facebook
 Jess Wright on Twitter

2012 singles
2012 songs
All Around the World Productions singles